Frolic is the second solo studio album by Norwegian singer Anneli Drecker, released on 4 April 2005 by Capitol Records.

Background
Drecker now releases the downtempo album Frolic with clear roots in the pure synth-pop. She is, however, not rooted there, but developed with today's more diverse soundscape within the genre electronica.

Critical reception

Robert Hoftun Gjestad of the Norwegian newspaper Aftenposten awarded the album grade 4, the reviewer Øyvind Rønning of the Norwegian newspaper Dagbladet awarded the album dice 3, and the Verdens Gang review awarded the album dice 4.

Track listing
All lyrics and music by Anneli Drecker, except where noted.

Notes
  signifies a co-producer
  signifies an additional producer

Charts

References

External links
 

2005 albums
Anneli Drecker albums
Capitol Records albums